Kunzea strigosa is a flowering plant in the myrtle family, Myrtaceae and is endemic to Western Australia.

Often found in wet depressions between ridges or low on slopes in a small area on the coast near where the Great Southern meets the Goldfields-Esperance region centred around the Fitzgerald River National Park where it grows in a sandy to clay loam soils.

References

strigosa
Endemic flora of Western Australia
Myrtales of Australia
Rosids of Western Australia
Plants described in 2007
Taxa named by Hellmut R. Toelken